Father figure is a psychology term.

Father Figure may also refer to:

"Father Figure" (George Michael song), 1987
"Father Figure" (Army of Anyone song), 2007
Father Figure (TV series), a comedy television series first broadcast in 2013
Father Figure (1980 film), a drama film by Jerry London
Father Figure (2017 film), a stand-up special by Roy Wood Jr.
Father Figures, a 2017 American comedy film